Nohsa is a census town and Gram Panchayat in Phulwari Sharif, Patna in Bihar state of India. It is a part of Patna urban agglomeration. Comes under Phulwari Assembly Constituency and Patliputra Parliamentary Constituency.

Situated in Phulwari Sharif Block. Distance from Patna is around 10 Km and from AIIMS Patna is about 2 Km.

Transport
Phulwari Sharif railway station and Danapur railway station are the nearby Railway Stations, which connects to many Metropolitan cities of India by the Howrah-Delhi Main Line. It is connected to major cities of India via NH139.

Nearest Airport is Jay Prakash Narayan Airport situated at a distance of 7 km.

References

Neighbourhoods in Patna
Cities and towns in Patna district